Icara may refer to:
 İcarə, Azerbaijan
 Içara, Brazil 
 International Child Abduction Remedies Act, International Child Abduction Remedies Act

See also
 Icaro (disambiguation)